Captain George William Francis Darvill  (26 October 1898 – September 1950) was an English World War I flying ace credited with nine aerial victories.

Early life
Darvill was born in East Meon, Petersfield, Hampshire, England, the son of Minnie M. and George Darvill. He worked as a farmer until he joined the Royal Flying Corps during World War I.

World War I
Darvill was commissioned as a probationary second lieutenant on 20 April 1917. He was awarded Royal Aero Club Aviators Certificate No. 4973 at RAF Hendon on 13 July 1917. His first, brief, assignment was a posting to No. 9 Squadron from October to December 1917; the squadron then moved forward to action in France. On 13 January 1918, he transferred to No. 18 Squadron to fly Airco DH.4 light bombers. Beginning on 10 March 1918, he began a string of nine aerial victories that did not end until 4 September 1918.

His succession of victories was rewarded by a Military Cross, which was gazetted on 3 June 1918. He was also promoted to temporary captain and appointed as a flight commander on 18 August 1918. August 1918 also saw his award of a Distinguished Flying Cross, although it was not gazetted until 2 November 1918. His citation read:

List of aerial victories

Post World War I
Darvill was discharged from the Royal Air Force on 12 September 1919.

On 16 January 1926, Darvill was married to Violet Ruth Collins at Ashtead; the report of the nuptials in Flight indicate that Darvill was still involved in the world of aviation.

He would leave his home in Ramsdean, Petersfield to enter the Royal Air Force Volunteer Reserve in September 1939. On 14 March 1941, he was commissioned as a probationary pilot officer with seniority from 14 February 1941. On 14 February 1942, he was confirmed in rank as a flight lieutenant.

George William Francis Darvill died in September 1950 in Christchurch, Hampshire, England.

References
Notes

Bibliography
 
 

1898 births
1950 deaths
People from East Meon
Royal Flying Corps officers
Royal Air Force personnel of World War I
British World War I flying aces
Royal Air Force Volunteer Reserve personnel of World War II
Recipients of the Military Cross
Recipients of the Distinguished Flying Cross (United Kingdom)